"Black-Throated Wind" is the second song from Grateful Dead member Bob Weir's solo debut, Ace. The song was written by Weir and lyricist John Perry Barlow about the experiences Barlow had on a road trip from New York City to San Francisco in 1971. Barlow has said that the experience was "right out of Easy Rider", in that he was accosted by locals in the American South for having long hair.

The song was performed by the Grateful Dead frequently in 1972, as heard on the live Europe '72 Volume 2, Steppin' Out with the Grateful Dead: England '72, Dick's Picks Volume 24, and Dick's Picks Volume 30. It also appears twice on Winterland 1973: The Complete Recordings. In addition, as part of the band's set at Winterland in October 1974, it appears on the Grateful Dead's fifth live album, Steal Your Face, released in 1976. The song was dropped from the setlist after 1974, and then was played occasionally after 1990. Featured on 30 Trips Around the Sun September 10, 1991 live from Madison Square Garden.
The song has gotten a revival, as Dead & Co., who formed in October 2015, put the song in their rotation, and was most recently played Nov 8 2019 in Hampton VA.

References

External links
 Annotated lyrics and song history

1972 songs
Grateful Dead songs
Songs written by Bob Weir